Landing is the last part of a flight, where a flying animal, aircraft, or spacecraft returns to the ground.

Landing may also refer to:

Arts and entertainment
 Landing (band), an American indie rock band
 The Landing (album), by Iron Savior, 2011
 "Landing", a song by Golden Earring from the 1969 album Eight Miles High
 Landing (series), a series of arcade flight simulator video games

Places
 Landing, New Jersey, U.S.
 The Landing (Kansas City), Missouri, U.S., a shopping mall
 The Landing Historic District, in Fort Wayne, Indiana, U.S.
 The Landing in Renton, a residential and commercial development in Renton, Washington, U.S.

Other uses
 Landing (water transport), a water terminal for river transport lines
 Landing operation, a military action
 Landing, a part of a stairway

See also 
 
 Landed (disambiguation)
 Landing Creek (disambiguation)
 Landing pad (disambiguation)
 Landing zone (disambiguation)
 Crash Landing (disambiguation)
 Emergency Landing (disambiguation)
 Forced Landing (disambiguation)